The Charters Towers Region is a local government area in North Queensland, Australia southwest of, and inland from the city of Townsville, based in Charters Towers. Established in 2008, it was preceded by two previous local government areas which dated back to the 1870s.

It has an estimated operating budget of A$27.5 m.

History 
Gugu Badhun (also known as Koko-Badun and Kokopatun) is an Australian Aboriginal language of North Queensland. The language region includes areas within the local government area of Charters Towers Region, particularly the localities of Greenvale and the Valley of Lagoons, and in the Upper Burdekin River area and in Abergowrie.

Prior to 2008, the Charters Towers Region was an entire area of two previous and distinct local government areas:

 the City of Charters Towers;
 and the Shire of Dalrymple.

The City of Charters Towers had its beginning in the Charters Towers Municipality which was proclaimed on 21 June 1877 under the Municipal Institutions Act 1864. It achieved a measure of autonomy in 1878 with the enactment of the Local Government Act. With the passage of the Local Authorities Act 1902, it became the Town of Charters Towers on 31 March 1903 and was proclaimed the City of Charters Towers on 13 April 1909.

The Shire of Dalymple began as Dalrymple Division, one of Queensland's 74 divisions created under the Divisional Boards Act 1879 on 11 November 1879. It became a Shire on 31 March 1903.

In July 2007, the Local Government Reform Commission released its report and recommended that the two areas amalgamate. Amongst its reasons given for this recommendation were improved service delivery and capacity through a larger asset base and increased operating revenue, and the fact that a significant (and growing) proportion of the Shire's population lived in Charters Towers's outer suburbs and bringing all of Charters Towers under one local government was viewed as desirable. It did not consider amalgamation with the neighbouring Townsville/Thuringowa region due to disparate communities of interest. Both councils opposed the amalgamation, although the City Council concluded it was inevitable due to a shared community of interest. On 15 March 2008, the City and Shire formally ceased to exist, and elections were held on the same day to elect councillors and a mayor to the Regional Council.

Wards
The council remains undivided and its elected body consists of six councillors and a mayor.

Mayors

 2008–2012: Ben Callcott 
 2012–2016: Franklin Beveridge
 2016–2020: Liz Schmidt 
2020–present: Franklin Charles Beveridge

Towns and localities 

The Charter Towers Region includes the following settlements:

Charters Towers area:
 Alabama Hill
 Charters Towers City
 Columbia
 Grand Secret
 Millchester
 Mosman Park
 Queenton
 Richmond Hill
 Southern Cross
 Toll
 Towers Hill

Dalrymple area:
 Basalt
 Black Jack
 Breddan
 Broughton
 Campaspe
 Crimea
 Dotswood
 Greenvale
 Hervey Range
 Homestead
 Llanarth
 Macrossan
 Mingela
 Paluma
 Pentland
 Ravenswood
 Sellheim
 Seventy Mile
 Valley of Lagoons

Libraries 
Charters Towers Regional Council operate the Excelsior public library in Charters Towers.

Population
The populations given relate to the component entities prior to 2008. The 2011 census  was the first for the new Region.

References

External links
 University of Queensland: Queensland Places: Charters Towers Regional Council

 
Charters Towers
North Queensland
Charters Towers
2008 establishments in Australia